The Emakina Group is a group of communication agencies in Europe. 

Emakina was founded 2001, with the merger of Ex Machina and Emalaya. At age 23 Brice Le Blevennec founded digital design studio Ex Machina, while Denis Steisel started e-business agency Emalaya in 1998. At the moment of their merger they had 35 employees.

In December 2021 EPAM Acquires Emakina Group.

Headquartered in Belgium, it also has agencies in Austria, Croatia, France, India, KSA, Poland, Qatar, Serbia, Sweden, Singapore, Switzerland, The Netherlands, Turkey, UAE and via its agency The Reference it opened an agency in the US in 2016.

The Emakina Group reported sales of EUR 77.3 million in 2016 and is listed on Alternext of Euronext Brussels since 2006 as ALEMK.

In February 2018, Emakina Group acquired New York Digital agency Karbyn for US$500,000‍ in cash.

Subsidiaries 
As of July 2017, the main subsidiary companies of this group are:
 Emakina - a digital agency spread across 10 offices around Europe.
 The Reference - a Ghent and Antwerp based digital agency with an additional office in New York. Founded in 1993, it was acquired by Emakina in 2007.
 Your Agency - a Belgian marketing agency.
 Robert & Marien - a Brussels-based media agency which delivers strategy and buying for all media.

Accomplishments
Emakina has executed digital projects for companies like Audi, AXA, Brussels Airlines, Deutsche Bank, Education Above All, Engie Electrabel, FIVB, Karl Lagerfeld, Lufthansa, Parrot, Rituals, and Segway.

Emakina has won multiple awards for projects in digital marketing, websites, e-commerce, applications and communication campaigns for clients like BIC, My Way, and Jaeger Le-Coultre and was elected ‘Horizon Interactive Agency of the Year’.

References 

Advertising agencies of Belgium
Marketing companies established in 2001
Holding companies of Belgium
Companies based in Brussels
Belgian companies established in 2001